Mau Power, born Patrick James Mau, is a hip hop artist from Thursday Island in the Torres Strait and is the first Australian rapper to tour from this region. He is also the founder and executive director of One Blood Hidden Image, the first Torres Strait independent record distribution label, film production and media company.

Career
While he recorded his first song in Brisbane when he was 17 and attending the University of Southern Queensland.

In 2012, Mau was a producer for the National Indigenous Television (NITV) Our Stories.

Mau's second album The Show Will Go On, an autobiography, was released in 2014 after being recorded over a period of two years. The album included a remake of "My Island Home", which he performed with Christine Anu at the 2018 Commonwealth Games Opening Ceremony in Australia on the Gold Coast.

In 2015, Mau was one selected as of the emerging Indigenous film producers to be part of the Screen Australia Indigenous Producers Initiative. He has also produced documentaries and music videos for NITV, SBS, ABC and online platforms. His production company also produces promotional and corporate films for health and educational organisations.

Mau has toured nationally and internationally and also collaborated with Australian musicians Archie Roach and Christine Anu. Eddie Mabo’s daughter, Gail Mabo, selected Mau to sing an ode she wrote to her father on the 20th anniversary of the Mabo decision, which overturned the notion of terra nullius in Australia.

On 26 January 2020, Mau was a guest performer at the Sydney Indigenous Smoking Ceremony on Australia Day.

In July 2020, he was nominated for two awards at the National Indigenous Music Awards.

Personal
Mau Power, who grew up on Thursday Island in the Torres Strait, is a Dhoebaw man of the Guda Malullgal nations and is guided by two cultures: Indigeous (Torres Strait Islander), and hip hop.

He was jailed in 2001 for nine months for a street fight and said this jail time made him reflect on his life, and he decided to focus on his music, which he said is dedicated to inspiring others.

Discography

Studio albums

Singles

Awards and nominations

National Indigenous Music Awards
The National Indigenous Music Awards (NIMA) is an annual award ceremony and recognises excellence, dedication, innovation and outstanding contribution to the Northern Territory music industry.

|-
| rowspan="2"| 2020
| "Himself"
|  Artist of the Year
| 
|-
| Blue Lotus the Awakening
| Album of the Year
| 
|-

Awards and nominations

J Awards
The J Awards are an annual series of Australian music awards that were established by the Australian Broadcasting Corporation's youth-focused radio station Triple J. They commenced in 2005.

|-
| J Awards of 2020
| Jaguar Jonze
| Unearthed Artist of the Year
| 
|-

Queensland Music Awards
The Queensland Music Awards (previously known as Q Song Awards) are annual awards celebrating Queensland, Australia's brightest emerging artists and established legends. They commenced in 2006.
 
|-
| 2020
| "Arrived" (featuring Marcus Corowa)
| Indigenous Song of the Year
| 
|-

References

External links

Torres Strait Islanders
Indigenous Australian musicians
Living people
Year of birth missing (living people)